Agnes Osazuwa (born 26 June 1989 in Benin City, Edo) is a female track and field sprint athlete who competes internationally for Nigeria.

Osazuwa represented Nigeria at the 2008 Summer Olympics in Beijing competing at the 4x100 metres relay together with Gloria Kemasuode, Oludamola Osayomi and Ene Franca Idoko she also took part in the 4x100 metres relay. In their first round heat they placed fourth behind Belgium, Great Britain and Brazil. Their time of 43.43 seconds was the best non-directly qualifying time and the sixth time overall out of sixteen participating nations. With this result they qualified for the final in which they replaced Osazuwa with Halimat Ismaila. They sprinted to a time of 43.04 seconds, a third place and a bronze medal behind Russia and Belgium. In 2016, the Russian team was disqualified and stripped of their gold medal due to doping violations by one of the Russian runners, Yuliya Chermoshanskaya, thereby promoting Nigeria to the silver medal position.

Achievements

References

External links
 
 
 
 
 Agnes Osazuwa at NBC Olympics website

1989 births
Living people
Nigerian female sprinters
Olympic athletes of Nigeria
Athletes (track and field) at the 2008 Summer Olympics
Athletes (track and field) at the 2016 Summer Olympics
Olympic silver medalists for Nigeria
Sportspeople from Benin City
Medalists at the 2008 Summer Olympics
Athletes (track and field) at the 2010 Commonwealth Games
Olympic silver medalists in athletics (track and field)
Commonwealth Games competitors for Nigeria
Olympic female sprinters